Peperomia xalana is a species of plant from the genus Peperomia. It was discovered in Veracruz, Mexico by Guido Mathieu in 1982. In Uxpanapa, Peperomia xalana has an elevation range of 120 m.

References

xalana
Flora of North America
Flora of Mexico
Flora of Veracruz
Plants described in 1982